Aleksandr Mikhailovich Vulfov (born 7 February 1998) is a Russian football player who plays for Kazakhstani club FC Akzhayik.

Club career
He made his debut in the Russian Football National League for FC Veles Moscow on 10 July 2021 in a game against FC Yenisey Krasnoyarsk.

References

External links
 
 Profile by Russian Football National League

1998 births
Footballers from Moscow
Living people
Russian footballers
Association football midfielders
FC Lokomotiv Moscow players
FC Olimp-Dolgoprudny players
FC Akzhayik players
FC Veles Moscow players
Russian Second League players
Russian First League players
Kazakhstan Premier League players
Russian expatriate footballers
Expatriate footballers in Kazakhstan
Russian expatriate sportspeople in Kazakhstan